Runanga Lake is one of several small lakes (the others including Oingo Lake and Potaka Lake) located to the northwest of the city of Hastings in the Hawke's Bay Region of the eastern North Island of New Zealand. Water from the lake flows into the Ngaruroro River.

References

Hastings District
Lakes of the Hawke's Bay Region